Montfort can refer to:

Feudal fiefs and houses
 Montfort-l'Amaury, a French noble house, extinct in the 14th century
 Montfort of Brittany, descendants in the female line, reigning house of the Duchy of Brittany in the 14th and 15th centuries
 Counts of Montfort, German noble dynasty in medieval Swabia
 Baron Montfort, English peerage 1295–1367, British peerage 1741–1851

People

House of Montfort-l'Amaury
 Amaury de Montfort (disambiguation), several individuals, including:
 Amaury III de Montfort (died 1137), Lord of Montfort l'Amaury and Count of Évreux
 Amaury de Montfort (died 1241) (1195–1241)
 Amaury de Montfort (priest) (1242–1301)
 Bertrade de Montfort (c.1059–1117), Queen of France
 Guillaume de Montfort (disambiguation), several individuals, including:
 Guillaume de Montfort of Hainaut
 Guillaume de Montfort (bishop of Paris)
 Guy de Montfort (disambiguation), several individuals, including:
 Guy de Montfort, Lord of Sidon (died 1228)
 Guy de Montfort, Count of Bigorre (died 1220)
 Guy de Montfort, Count of Nola (1244–c.1288)
 Henry de Montfort (1238–1265)
 Philip of Montfort, Lord of Castres (?–1270)
 Philip of Montfort, Lord of Tyre (?–1270)
 Richard de Montfort (c.1066–1092), Lord of Montfort l'Amaury
 Simon de Montfort (disambiguation), several individuals, including:
 Simon I de Montfort (c.1025–1087), Lord of Montfort l'Amaury
 Simon II de Montfort (c.1068–1101), Lord of Montfort l'Amaury
 Simon de Montfort, 5th Earl of Leicester (1160–1218), Lord of Montfort l'Amaury
 Simon de Montfort, 6th Earl of Leicester (1208–1265), pioneer of parliamentary representation

House of Montfort-sur-Risle
 Peter de Montfort (died 1265), descendant of Hugues II de Montfort-sur-Risle
 William de Montfort (second half of the 13th century), English medieval canon law scholar, singer, churchman, and university chancellor; son of Peter de Montfort

Swabian house of Montfort
 Hugo von Montfort (1357–1423), Austrian minstrel
 Johanna Katharina von Montfort (1678-1759), consort and later regent of Hohenzollern-Sigmaringen

Other
 Louis de Montfort (1673–1716), French priest and saint
 Maxime Monfort (born 1983), Belgian cyclist
 Nick Montfort (fl. 1999–2016), contemporary poet
 Pierre Denys de Montfort (1766–1820), French naturalist
 Matthew Montfort (fl. 1978), guitarist of Ancient Future
 Montfort Stokes (1762–1842), U.S. Senator
 Roberto Monfort (born 1967), Brazilian Militar

Education
 De Montfort University, a university in Leicester, England
 Montfort Secondary School, a Catholic schools in Singapore
 Montfort Junior School, a Catholic schools in Singapore
 Montfort School, Yercaud, a boarding school in Yercaud, Tamil Nadu, India
 Montfort School, Kolathur, a secondary school in Salem District, Tamil Nadu, India
 Montfort Senior Secondary School, a Catholic school in New Delhi, India
 Montfort College, a Catholic school in Chiang Mai, Thailand
 The De Montfort School, a high school and middle school in Evesham, England
 Montfort-Gymnasium Tettnang, a school for higher education in Tettnang, Germany

Places

Canada
 Montfort Hospital, a hospital in Ottawa, Canada
 Montfort, a community in the municipality of Wentworth-Nord, Quebec

France
 Monfort, in the Gers département
 Montfort, Alpes-de-Haute-Provence, in the Alpes-de-Haute-Provence département
 Montfort, Doubs, in the Doubs département
 Montfort, Isère, in the Isère département on the road between Grenoble and Chambéry – part of the commune of Lumbin
 Montfort, Maine-et-Loire, in the Maine-et-Loire département
 Montfort, Pyrénées-Atlantiques, in the Pyrénées-Atlantiques département
 Montfort-en-Chalosse, in the Landes département
 Montfort-l'Amaury, in the Yvelines département
 Montfort-le-Gesnois, in the Sarthe département
 Montfort-sur-Argens, in the Var département
 Montfort-sur-Boulzane, in the Aude département
 Montfort-sur-Meu, in the Ille-et-Vilaine département
 Montfort-sur-Risle, in the Eure département
 Château de Montfort, a castle in the Dordogne département.

Israel
 Montfort (castle), crusader castle in western Galilee

Netherlands
 Montfort, Netherlands, a town in Limburg
 Montfoort, a town in Utrecht

United Kingdom 
 Fry's Island, also known as De Montfort Island, in the River Thames

United States
 Montfort, Wisconsin, a village

Other 
 De Montfort Hall, a music and performance venue in Leicester, United Kingdom
 De Montfort Park, a football stadium complex in Hinckley, United Kingdom
 Simon de Montfort's Parliament, an early English parliament

See also
 Amaury de Montfort (disambiguation)
 Monforte (disambiguation)
 Monteforte, a surname